Joanne Kirsty Clifton (born 24 October 1983) is an English professional dancer, presenter, actress, and singer. She won the World Ballroom Showdance Championship in 2014, and won the European Professional Ballroom Championship and World Dancesport Games. She was a professional dancer on the BBC TV series Strictly Come Dancing from 2014 to 2016, winning the Christmas Special in 2015 with Harry Judd who was series 9 champion and the fourteenth series in 2016 with Ore Oduba. She also appeared as an expert presenter on Strictly Come Dancing: It Takes Two in 2015 and 2019.

Clifton played the title role of Millie Dillmount in the UK tour of Thoroughly Modern Millie in 2017. She starred as the lead role of Janet Weiss in the UK tour of The Rocky Horror Show. As of 2021, she is starring as Morticia Addams in the 2nd UK Tour of  The Addams Family

Dancing career 
Clifton started dancing ballroom and Latin as a child in her home village of Waltham, taught by her parents, former world number ones Keith and Judy Clifton. She competed nationally and internationally as a child, initially partnering her brother Kevin. Later, she chose to specialise in ballroom so as not to directly compete against her brother. She has competed in both ballroom and Latin since the age of 4. She has been a British Champion five times and Italian Champion three times, and was Professional Ballroom European Champion in 2012 and Professional World Dancesport Games Champion in 2013.

In 2000, Clifton moved to Bologna, Italy, to train with Team Diablo, the biggest dance school in Europe. She was initially partnered with Marco Cavallaro, reaching sixth in the world in amateur rankings with him. She moved to professional competition when she was chosen to partner Paolo Bosco in 2011. In 2013, they were amongst ten other professional dancing couples to be invited to perform at the Kremlin. She and her partner became champions of the World Dancesport Games in Taiwan in 2013 and won the World Professional Ballroom Showdance Championships in Merano, Italy, later that year. Clifton danced with Bosco competitively until his retirement on 15 December 2013. She retired from competitive dancing on 19 December 2013.

From April to May 2014, she joined her brother as a dancer in the Burn the Floor Dance Company, performing in the show's tour of Australia and Japan.

In 2015, Clifton appeared in her first musical production, Face the Music at Ye Olde Rose and Crown Theatre, playing Street Walker for which she received an Offie nomination for her role. In 2016, she appeared in Norma Jean The Musical, playing the title character, Marilyn Monroe.

In early 2017, Clifton appeared as the lead role of Millie Dillmount, in the UK Tour of Thoroughly Modern Millie. She will play the lead role of Alex Owens in the UK Tour of Flashdance the Musical.

Between December 2017 and January 2018, Clifton played the role of Dale Tremont in the musical Top Hat

Strictly Come Dancing
In 2014, Clifton was confirmed as a professional dancer on the BBC's Strictly Come Dancing. She was partnered with the DJ Scott Mills. They made it through to week six but were eliminated in the Halloween show. On 6 November 2014, Clifton appeared on BBC Radio 1's Innuendo Bingo. Clifton remained part of the professional line up for the following series but was not given a partner for the main show. She did, however, compete in the Children in Need special with the actor Stephen McGann and went on to win the Christmas Special with the series 9 winner Harry Judd. Clifton returned full-time to the main show for the fourteenth series and was paired with the TV presenter Ore Oduba. On 17 December they were crowned the winners, giving her her first win of the main series.

It was announced on 21 June 2017 that Clifton was to leave Strictly Come Dancing as a professional dancer after three years, due to wanting to progress in her musical theatre career.

Performances
Series 12 with Scott Mills

Series 14 with Ore Oduba

Personal life 
Clifton grew up in the small North East Lincolnshire village of Waltham with her older brother, Kevin Clifton, mother, Judy Clifton and father Keith Clifton. She attended East Ravendale Primary School and Caistor Grammar School.

References

External links 
 
 http://joclifton.wordpress.com/joanne-clifton/

1983 births
Living people
People educated at Caistor Grammar School
People from the Borough of North East Lincolnshire
Strictly Come Dancing winners